"Konna ni Chikaku de..." is Crystal Kay's 20th single, released on February 28, 2007. It was Kay's second single from the album All Yours after "Kitto Eien ni". This single was used for the ending credits of Japanese anime Nodame Cantabile. In the anime, the melody from the song is used in accompaniment on the piano throughout the anime as background music. The song was then replaced after the twelfth episode of the anime by the song "Sagittarius" by Suemitsu and the Nodame Orchestra.

Track listing

Charts 

2007 singles
2007 songs
Crystal Kay songs
Nodame Cantabile